Petrus Draghi Bartoli (23 July 1646 – 13 April 1695) was a Roman Catholic prelate who served as Titular Patriarch of Alexandria (1690–1695).

Biography
Petrus Draghi Bartoli was born in Venice, Italy on 23 July 1646 and ordained a priest on 28 December 1670.
On 13 November 1690, he was appointed during the papacy of Pope Alexander VIII as Titular Patriarch of Alexandria.
On 19 November 1690, he was consecrated bishop by Giambattista Rubini, Bishop of Vicenza, with Ercole Visconti, Titular Archbishop of Tamiathis, and Franciscus Liberati, Titular Archbishop of Ephesus, serving as co-consecrators. 
He served as Titular Patriarch of Alexandria until his death on 13 April 1695.

Episcopal succession
While bishop, he was the principal co-consecrator of:

References

External links and additional sources
 (for Chronology of Bishops)
 (for Chronology of Bishops)

17th-century Roman Catholic titular bishops
Bishops appointed by Pope Alexander VIII
1646 births
1695 deaths